Johanna Krawczyk (born 1984) is a French writer and screenwriter. She was educated at Sciences Po, UCL and Paris 3.

In 2019 she co-wrote the Cannes-nominated short film, L'heure de l'ours (And Then the Bear). Director and co-writer Agnès Patron described the process as "a very instinctive collaboration."

Avant elle, her first novel, was published in 2021 and was shortlisted for the Prix de la Closerie des Lilas.

References

 

1984 births
Living people
French women novelists
French women screenwriters
21st-century French novelists
21st-century French screenwriters
Sorbonne Nouvelle University Paris 3 alumni
21st-century French women